Almanac was a jazz project whose members were Bennie Maupin (flute, tenor saxophone), Cecil McBee (bass), Mike Nock (piano) and Eddie Marshall (drums).

Discography
1977: Almanac (Improvising Artists)

References

American jazz ensembles
Free jazz ensembles